The effective potential (also known as effective potential energy) combines multiple, perhaps opposing, effects into a single potential. In its basic form, it is the sum of the 'opposing' centrifugal potential energy with the potential energy of a dynamical system. It may be used to determine the orbits of planets (both Newtonian and relativistic) and to perform semi-classical atomic calculations, and often allows problems to be reduced to fewer dimensions.

Definition

The basic form of potential  is defined as:

where
L is the angular momentum
r is the distance between the two masses
μ is the reduced mass of the two bodies (approximately equal to the mass of the orbiting body if one mass is much larger than the other); and
U(r) is the general form of the potential.

The effective force, then, is the negative gradient of the effective potential:

where  denotes a unit vector in the radial direction.

Important properties
There are many useful features of the effective potential, such as

A circular orbit may be either stable or unstable. If it is unstable, a small perturbation could destabilize the orbit, but a stable orbit would return to equilibrium. To determine the stability of a circular orbit, determine the concavity of the effective potential. If the concavity is positive, the orbit is stable:

The frequency of small oscillations, using basic Hamiltonian analysis, is

Gravitational potential

Consider a particle of mass m orbiting a much heavier object of mass M.  Assume Newtonian mechanics, which is both classical and non-relativistic. The conservation of energy and angular momentum give two constants E and L, which have values

when the motion of the larger mass is negligible. In these expressions,
 is the derivative of r with respect to time,
 is the angular velocity of mass m,
G is the gravitational constant,
E is the total energy, and
L is the angular momentum.

Only two variables are needed, since the motion occurs in a plane.  Substituting the second expression into the first and rearranging gives

where

is the effective potential. The original two-variable problem has been reduced to a one-variable problem.  For many applications the effective potential can be treated exactly like the potential energy of a one-dimensional system: for instance, an energy diagram using the effective potential determines turning points and locations of stable and unstable equilibria. A similar method may be used in other applications, for instance determining orbits in a general relativistic Schwarzschild metric.

Effective potentials are widely used in various condensed matter subfields, e.g. the Gauss-core potential (Likos 2002, Baeurle 2004) and the screened Coulomb potential (Likos 2001).

See also
Geopotential

Notes

References

Further reading
 .
 

 

 

Mechanics
Potentials